www
This is a list of local newspapers in Mauritius in alphabetical order.

Mauritius

Local newspapers

Defunct
These newspapers are no longer published.

Online news

Rodrigues Island

See also 

 Media of Mauritius
 Lists of newspapers
 List of magazines in Mauritius
 List of radio stations in Mauritius
 Newspaper circulation
 List of newspapers in the world by circulation

References

Bibliography

External links
 

Mauritius
Lists of mass media in Mauritius